Jaymillio Pinas (born 3 May 2002) is a Dutch professional footballer who plays as a forward for Dordrecht.

Club career
Pinas began his football career at FC Abcoude and Volendam, where he played until 2017. He then moved to the youth academy of Ajax. In the 2017–18 season he played for the under-17 team, for whom he scored once in two games. In the following season he played for both the U17 and U19 sides and was utilised a total of 24 times, scoring nine goals and making six assists. At the end of the season he won the cup and league double with the under-19s. In 2019–20, he was a regular of the U19 team and also played in the UEFA Youth League, where his team reached the semi-finals. He also made his Eerste Divisie debut against Jong PSV on 16 September 2019, against which he provided an assist for Max de Waal. In the following season he scored his first goal for the team against Helmond Sport on 9 January 2021 and also provided an assist. During the season he established himself as a regular in the Jong Ajax team.

On 28 January 2022, Pinas signed a two-year contract with Dordrecht.

International career
Born in the Netherlands, Pinas is of Surinamese descent. Pinas is a youth international for the Netherlands.

Career statistics

Club

Notes

References

External links
 

2002 births
Living people
Dutch footballers
Netherlands youth international footballers
Association football forwards
FC Volendam players
AFC Ajax players
Jong Ajax players
FC Dordrecht players
Eerste Divisie players
Dutch sportspeople of Surinamese descent